Orthocomotis phenax is a species of moth of the family Tortricidae. It is found in Mexico (Veracruz) and Costa Rica.

Subspecies
Orthocomotis phenax phenax (Costa Rica)
Orthocomotis phenax phobetica Razowski & Becker, 1990 (Mexico: Veracruz)

References

Moths described in 1990
Orthocomotis